The 2020–21 Bucknell Bison men's basketball team represented Bucknell University in the 2020–21 NCAA Division I men's basketball season. The Bison, led by sixth-year head coach Nathan Davis, play their home games at Sojka Pavilion in Lewisburg, Pennsylvania as members of the Patriot League. With the creation of mini-divisions to cut down on travel due to the COVID-19 pandemic, they play in the Central Division.

Previous season
The Bison finished the 2019–20 season 14–20, 8–10 in Patriot League play to finish in a tie for sixth place. They defeated Holy Cross and American to advance to the semifinals of the Patriot League tournament, where they lost to Boston University.

Roster

Schedule and results 

|-
!colspan=12 style=| Patriot League regular season

|-
!colspan=12 style=| Patriot League tournament
|-

|-

Source

References

Bucknell Bison men's basketball seasons
Bucknell Bison
Bucknell Bison men's basketball
Bucknell Bison men's basketball